Peter Beardsley's International Football is a football video game developed in 1988 by Grandslam and endorsed by Peter Beardsley.

Gameplay 
Players select an international team to play as, and can choose to play against the computer in a one player league format, or two players in a two player league format. They can then select the other teams in each group.

Reception 

The Commodore 64 version was reviewed poorly by Zzap!64, which gave it a score of 23%, stating that it is "one of the worst football games around at the moment".

References

External links 
 Entry at GameSpot

1988 video games
Association football video games
ZX Spectrum games
Commodore 64 games
Cultural depictions of association football players
Cultural depictions of British men
Amstrad CPC games
Video games set in Europe
Multiplayer and single-player video games
Teque London games
Video games developed in the United Kingdom
Video games based on real people